The 1944–45 Gauliga Donau-Alpenland was the seventh and final season of the Gauliga Donau-Alpenland, formerly the Gauliga Ostmark, the first tier of football in German-annexed Austria from 1938 to 1945.

The 1944–45 edition was not completed and stopped after nine rounds. Nazi Germany surrendered on 8 May 1945 and, in the following season, an independent Austrian football championship was held again.

Table
The 1944–45 season saw two new clubs in the league, SC Rapid Oberlaa and SK Admira Wien. As the league was being expanded for next season from 10 to 12 clubs, no relegation took place.

 The fixture between Wiener Sportclub and SC Rapid Oberlaa was abandoned; this game was recorded as a 0-0 loss against both sides, which explains why there appear to be two more losses than victories.

Results

References

External links
 Das Deutsche Fussball Archiv  Historic German league tables

Gauliga Ostmark seasons
Austria
Football
1944–45 in German football leagues